Sahand Metro Station is a station on Tabriz Metro Line 1. The station opened on 27 August 2015. It is located next on Bakeri Boulevard at Kuy-e Sahand neighbourhood. It is between El Goli Metro Station and Emam Reza Metro Station.

References

Tabriz Metro stations